Kässbohrer Geländefahrzeug AG is a specialized vehicle manufacturer based in Laupheim, Germany. It is the worldwide market leader in snow grooming and sand cleaning machines marketed under the brands PistenBully and BeachTech.

Company 
The company was formed in 1994 through a management buy out of the snow and sand divisions during the breakup of Karl Kässbohrer Fahrzeugwerke.It was publicly traded from 1998 until it was taken private in 2015, when Ludwig Merckle's LuMe holding company, which had previously owned over 95% of shares, bought out minority shareholders for an aggregate EUR 13.8 million.

Products

PistenBully 

Kässbohrer's largest division is snow grooming vehicles, which represents  90% of the company's revenues. The division develops, manufactures, sells and services equipment for maintaining ski hills. The PistenBully brand dominates the worldwide market for such machinery.

BeachTech 

Kässbohrer launched a separate line of beach grooming machines in 1991.

PowerBully 
In 2014 Kässbohrer acquired Soft Track Supply Inc., a manufacturer of niche tracked utility vehicles, and renamed the product line PowerBully. Soft Track had operated since 1989 and was based in Cartersville, Georgia.

See also
 Setra

References 

1990 establishments in Germany
German brands
Manufacturing companies of Germany
Companies based in Baden-Württemberg